Ahern is an unincorporated community in Kankakee County, Illinois, United States.

References

Unincorporated communities in Illinois
Unincorporated communities in Kankakee County, Illinois